The Vermilion Bird is one of the Four Symbols of the Chinese constellations. According to Wu Xing, the Taoist five elemental system, it represents the Fire element, the direction south, and the season summer correspondingly. Thus it is sometimes called the Vermilion Bird of the South (Chinese:). It is described as a red bird that resembles a pheasant with a five-colored plumage and is perpetually covered in flames. It is known as Suzaku in Japanese, Jujak in Korean and Chu Tước in Vietnamese.

It is often mistaken for the Fenghuang due to similarities in appearance, but the two are different creatures. The Fenghuang is a legendary ruler of birds who is associated with the Chinese Empress in the same way the dragon is associated with the Emperor, while the Vermilion Bird is a mythological spirit creature of the Chinese constellations.

Seven Mansions of the Vermilion Bird 
As with the other three Symbols, there are seven astrological "Mansions" (positions of the Moon) within the Vermilion Bird. The names and determinative stars are:

Nature of the symbol 

The Vermilion Bird is elegant and noble in both appearance and behavior, with feathers in many different hues of vermilion. It is very selective about what it eats and where it perches.

Stars

In popular culture 

In the video game Apex Legends, Suzaku is the name of the character Valkyrie's heirloom melee weapon. The weapon is a futuristic version of a traditionally-Japanese Yari winged spear, with small flaming rocket thrusters. It suits her half-Japanese heritage, as well as pays homage to the winged spears commonly associated with a  Valkyrie in Norse mythology.
In the mobile game Puzzle & Dragons, the Vermilion Bird is depicted as a beautiful, phoenix-like, winged woman who wields the power of flames, known as the "Incarnation of Suzaku, Leilan".
In the Beyblade series, the Vermilion Bird is called Dranzer.
In B-Daman Fireblast, the main protagonist Kamon Godai's B-daman is named Drive Garuburn, whose B-Animal is the Vermilion Bird of the South.
In the Digimon series, Zhuqiaomon is designed after it.
In the Fushigi Yûgi series, Miaka Yūki's journey in the Universe of the Four Gods involves her becoming the Priestess of Suzaku. The god is shown as a bird for most of the series, with only the final few episodes showing him in a humanoid, winged form.
In the video game Final Fantasy Type-0, the Vermilion Bird is the name of one of the four Crystals of Orience, representing the Dominion of Rubrum.
In the video game Final Fantasy XI, Suzaku is one of the 'Gods' in Tu'Lia, the endgame zone introduced in the 'Rise of the Zilart' expansion.
In the video game Final Fantasy XIV, Suzaku is one of the auspices introduced in the second expansion of the game, Stormblood.
In the film Gamera 3: The Revenge of Iris, the titular Iris - the film's primary antagonist - is at one point described as the Vermilion Bird of the South, destined to oppose Gamera, who is identified as the Black Tortoise of the North.
In Inuyasha, Suzaku is one of the demon ninjas voiced by Toth.
In Kung Fu Panda: The Paws of Destiny, Fan Tong, one of Po's students has the chi of the Red Phoenix, one of the Four Constellations.
In the Yu Yu Hakusho series, Suzaku is portrayed in a humanoid form as leader of the Underworld group The Four Beasts.

In the video game Nioh, there is a spirit guardian phoenix named a Suzaku that will resurrect players upon death by activating their living weapon. Once the living weapon runs out, the player is brought back with one hit point.
In Tokyo Majin, the Vermilion Bird has a vessel who is a character known as Marie Claire.
In Kemono Friends, the Vermilion Bird is anthropomorphised along with the other Chinese Four Symbols.
In Yami no Matsuei, the Vermilion Bird, known only as Suzaku, appears as a shikigami that is summoned by Asato Tsuzuki
In Overwatch'''s 2018 Chinese New Year (Year of the Dog) event, Mercy, one of the game's support heroes, has a cosmetic skin based on the Vermilion Bird.
In World of Warcraft: Mists of Pandaria, the Vermilion Bird has been used as the major inspiration to create Chi-Ji, the Red Crane.
In Sekiro, the upgrade to the Loaded Umbrella prosthetic tool, Suzaku's Lotus Umbrella is a red shield that protects the player from fire damage.
In Slash Dog light novel series, one of the heroines and lover of the protagonist, Suzaku Himejima is a powerful Shinto priestess and the host of the Vermilion Bird.
In Mobile Legends: Bang Bang, one of the heroes that greatly represents the symbol of Vermilion Bird was named after Ling.
In Xenoblade Chronicles 2, there is an anthropomorphic bird blade named Suzaku, Roc in English localization.
In Fire Emblem: Three Houses, one of the four saints, Macuil, takes the form of a bird-like dragon representing the Vermilion Bird.
In Yakuza 4, the four playable characters are represented by the Chinese Four Symbols, with the Vermilion Bird representing Shun Akiyama.
In the Pokémon series, Tornadus' Therian Forme is based on the Vermilion Bird. Like the Vermilion Bird, it was intended to be colored red, but the designer of Throh and Sawk, Ken Sugimori, felt their colors made their design too similar to that of Tornadus and Thundurus, so the colors of Tornadus and Thundurus were changed. In Tornadus's case, the coloring was changed to mostly green, but also includes purple, white and yellow.
 In Yashahime: Princess Half-Demon, protagonist Setsuna's newest attack of her Yukari no Tachikiri is Vermillion Bird Ambush which contrary to its name is not red at all.
 In the 2022 mobile game Dislyte'', Li Guang is an Epic Esper with the powers of the Vermilion Bird.

See also 
Birds in Chinese mythology
Four Holy Beasts of Vietnam

References

External links 
 "Star Charts and Moon Stations"
 The Red Bird of the South

Chinese constellations
Four Symbols
Guardians of the directions
Mythological and legendary Chinese birds
Onmyōdō deities
Phoenix birds